Vadym Tkachuk (born 9 March 1970) is a Ukrainian modern pentathlete. He competed in the men's individual event at the 2000 Summer Olympics.

References

1970 births
Living people
Ukrainian male modern pentathletes
Olympic modern pentathletes of Ukraine
Modern pentathletes at the 2000 Summer Olympics
Place of birth missing (living people)